Poggio Imperiale is a town and comune in the province of Foggia in the Apulia region of southeast Italy.

Twin towns
 Vorë, Albania, since 2011

References

Cities and towns in Apulia